Yesvantpur–Latur Express is  an Express train belonging to South Western Railway zone of Indian Railways that runs between  and  in India.

Background
This train was inaugurated on 3 February 2018, an extension of Yesvantpur–Bidar Express for connectivity between the southern parts of Marathwada (a region in Maharashtra) to Bangalore.

Service
The frequency of this train is three days a week, it covers the distance of 854 km with an average speed of 49 km/hr.

Routes

Traction
As this route is currently going to be electrified, a WDP-4 based loco pulls the train to its destination on both sides.

External links
 16583 Yesvantpur Latur Express
 16584 Latur Yesvantpur Express

References

Express trains in India
Rail transport in Karnataka
Rail transport in Andhra Pradesh
Rail transport in Telangana
Rail transport in Maharashtra
Transport in Bangalore